The 1990 Louisiana Tech Bulldogs football team was an American football team that represented Louisiana Tech University as an independent during the 1990 NCAA Division I-A football season. In their third year under head coach Joe Raymond Peace, the team compiled an 8–3–1 record and tied Maryland in the Independence Bowl.

Schedule

References

Louisiana Tech Bulldogs
Louisiana Tech Bulldogs football seasons
Louisiana Tech Bulldogs football